Male Back With a Flag is a chalk drawing by Michelangelo Buonarroti, from 1504.

Description 
The painting is a drawing on paper, with dimensions of 19.6 x 27 centimeters. It is in the collection of the Albertina, Vienna.

Analysis 
It was a study for the planned mural Battle of Cascina.

References

Sources 

1500s drawings
1504 works
Drawings by Michelangelo
Collections of the Albertina, Vienna